Bogoslovka is a rural locality (a selo) in Verkhnekhavskoye Rural Settlement, Verkhnekhavsky District, Voronezh Oblast, Russia. The population was 95 as of 2010. There are 3 streets.

Geography 
Bogoslovka is located 12 km east of Verkhnyaya Khava (the district's administrative centre) by road. Verkhnyaya Maza is the nearest rural locality.

References 

Rural localities in Verkhnekhavsky District